Navniti Prasad Singh (born 6 November 1955) is an Indian Judge and former Chief Justice of the Kerala High Court.

Career
Singh completed his schooling from Scindia School of Gwalior, graduated and passed Law from Delhi University. He was enrolled as Advocate on 2 July 1980 and started practice in Patna and Jharkhand High Court on Commercial, Taxation and Constitutional matters. In his lawyer career he appeared on behalf of the State Bank of India, Lalit Narayan Mithila University and other statutory authorities. Singh became a Senior Advocate in December 2004. On 6 March 2006 he was appointed an additional Judge of Patna High Court. Justice Singh was elevated in the post of the Chief Justice of the Kerala High Court on 20 March 2017. He retired on 6 November 2017.

References

1955 births
Living people
Indian judges
Judges of the Patna High Court
Chief Justices of the Kerala High Court
21st-century Indian lawyers
21st-century Indian judges
Delhi University alumni
Scindia School alumni
People from Gwalior